Ashmuji is a village in Kulgam district of Jammu and Kashmir in India. Cricketer Rasikh Salam Dar was born in Ashmuji.

Ashmuji is a Municipal Committee city in district of Kulgam, Jammu and Kashmir. The Ashmuji city is divided into 5 wards for which elections are held every 5 years. The Ashmuji Municipal Committee has population of 5,567 of which 2,824 are males while 2,743 are females as per report released by Census India 2011.

Population of Children with age of 0-6 is 875 which is 15.72% of total population of Ashmuji (MC). In Ashmuji Municipal Committee, Female Sex Ratio is of 971 against state average of 889. Moreover Child Sex Ratio in Ashmuji is around 838 compared to Jammu and Kashmir state average of 862. Literacy rate of Ashmuji city is 67.41% higher than state average of 67.16%. In Ashmuji, Male literacy is around 78.66% while female literacy rate is 56.14%.

Ashmuji Municipal Committee has total administration over 1,016 houses to which it supplies basic amenities like water and sewerage. It is also authorize to build roads within Municipal Committee limits and impose taxes on properties coming under its jurisdiction.

References 

Villages in Kulgam district